Indian Military Intelligence is a 1995 Indian Malayalam-language film, directed by T. S. Suresh Babu, starring K. B. Ganesh Kumar, Babu Antony and Murali. This film was a third box_office hit Malayalam film of the year behind Mazhayethum Munpe and Agnidevan

Cast
 K. B. Ganesh Kumar as ACP Shivaprasad IPS	
 Murali as Captain Anthony Domenic
 Babu Antony as Imran Khan
 Srividya as  Shivaprasad's mother
 Chippy as Sreedevi Varma
 Jose Prakash as Shivaprasad's grandfather
 Kuchan as Thankappan/George Spielberg 
 Thikkurissy Sukumaran Nair as Valiya Thamburan 	
 Sukumaran as Major B. Rajaraja Varma
 Kundara Johny as Captain Sharma/Akbar
 Kuthiravattam Pappu as Aroodam Anandan
 P. C. George as Mohammed Sarkar
 Manu Varma as Jayakumar
 Prathapachandran as Comm. George Mathew
 Bheeman Raghu as Alex Ambalakkadan
 M. G. Soman as Ravi Varma
 Narayanankutty as Chandra Varma
 Poojappura Ravi as Mohana Varma
 K.P.A.C. Sunny as Shekhara Varmma	
 Manjula Vijayakumar as Gracy
 Usharani as Mappasu Mariyamma
Ratheesh as Auto decoratives proprietor 
 Mohan Jose as Police officer
 Mohan Raj as Telephone operator
 Jayaram as Cameo Appearance in a song
 K. Madhu as himself 
 Annie as Cameo Appearance in a song
Kavitha Thambi as Prabha
 Biju Pappan

References

External links

1995 films
1990s Malayalam-language films